The Totalvision Company was a French corporation that specialized in the design and manufacturing of lenses, cameras, and projection systems primarily focused on anamorphic optics. It was founded in June 1954. Totalvision was created and managed by Georges Bonnerot and Elie Libman students of Professor Henri Chrétien. 
Circa 1956, the company experienced significant expansion to foreign markets. Totalvision cameras equipment and lenses were sold in East Germany (DDR), Yugoslavia, Czechoslovakia, China, Portugal, Spain, Italy, Romania, and Bulgaria.

Totalvision was a competitor of Cinemascope in Europe, providing cheaper licensing fees to European markets while presenting cinematographers with equipment of equal or better quality. The system comprised a wide range of anamorphic lenses, from 32mm to 150mm, that created little distortion and made CinemaScope almost obsolete in Europe.

France
 Cinematographers such as: Claude Renoir, Louis Page, Lucien Joulin, Michel Kelber and Henri Alekan used Totalvision equipment for their work. All cameras were equipped with specifically designed couplings allowing a single primary and anamorphic focusing.
 Totalvision created an affordable 16mm anamorphic projection lens under the brand of Ruralscope which was marketed and sold to movie theaters in rural France.

Italy
Polish-born director of photography/cinematographer Henryk Chroscicki bought rights to manufacture Totalvison's equipment in Italy and effectively became a rental house and a distributor for Italian filmmakers. More than 200 major films, including La Dolce Vita, and 300 documentaries have been shot with Totalvision equipment under the brand name of Totalscope. Based on his ownership of rights for Totalvision equipment, Henryk Chroscicki developed the anamorphic lens system Technovision which made its first appearance in 1974.

Films Made with Totalvision

See also
 Arriscope
 Aspect ratio
 Cine 160
 Letterbox
 List of film formats
 Pan and scan
 21:9 aspect ratio

Citations

French inventions
Film and video technology
Motion picture film formats
Movie camera manufacturers